The New York Renaissance, also known as the Renaissance Big R Five and as the Rens, were the first black-owned, all-black, fully-professional basketball team in history, established in October 1923, by Robert "Bob" Douglas. They were named after the Renaissance Casino and Ballroom through an agreement with its owner, in return for the use of that facility as their home court. The Casino and Ballroom at 138th Street and Seventh Avenue in Harlem was an entertainment complex that included a ballroom, which served as the Rens' home court. The team eventually had its own house orchestra and games were often followed by a dance. Their subsequent financial success shifted the focus of black basketball from amateurism to professionalism. Initially, the Rens played mostly in Harlem, but Douglas soon realized they could book more games on the road, in larger-capacity venues, and took up barnstorming across the country for more lucrative payouts. The Renaissance are also the topic of the 2011 documentary On the Shoulders of Giants.

Early years
The Rens were one of the dominant basketball teams of the 1920s and 1930s.  They were originally known as the Spartan Braves, the basketball team of the Spartan Field Club, a Manhattan-based multi-sport amateur athletic organization whose initial focus was cricket. The Rens played their first game on November 3, 1923, winning against the Collegiate Five, an all-white team. Interracial games featured regularly on their schedule, drawing the largest crowds. In its first years, the team strove to beat the Original Celtics, the dominant white team of the time, and claim the title of world champions.  In their fifth encounter, the Rens did so for the first time, on December 20, 1925. During the 1932-33 regular season, the Rens compiled a record of 120-8 (six of those losses came at the hands of the Celtics, whom the Rens did beat eight times). During that season, the Rens won 88 consecutive games, a mark that has never been matched by a professional basketball team. In 1939, the Rens won the first professional basketball championship, when they beat the Oshkosh All-Stars, a white team, 34-25, in the World Professional Basketball Tournament in Chicago.

The team compiled a 2588-529 record from 1923 to 1948. Important players on the Rens roster included Clarence "Fats" Jenkins, Pappy Ricks, Eyre Saitch, Bill Yancey, "Wee" Willie Smith, Charles "Tarzan" Cooper, Zack Clayton, John Isaacs, Dolly King, Pop Gates, and Nat Clifton. In 1936, the Renaissance became the first top-level team to sign a four-year African American college star, David "Big Dave" DeJernett of Indiana Central.

1949: Move to Dayton

The Rens relocated during the 1948–49 basketball season to Dayton, Ohio, to replace the Detroit Vagabond Kings, who folded in December 1948. The Vagabond Kings had been playing in the racially integrated National Basketball League (NBL). The Rens played the remainder of the NBL season as the Dayton Rens, then disbanded. It was also the final season for the NBL, which merged with the all-white Basketball Association of America to form the also (initially) all-white National Basketball Association.

Memorials and historic recognition 
 The Naismith Memorial Basketball Hall of Fame inducted the 1932-33 New York Renaissance team collectively in 1963 in recognition of their 88-game winning streak that season, the longest in professional basketball history. Seven former Rens players are individually enshrined: Tarzan Cooper, Pop Gates, Nat Clifton, John Isaacs, Zack Clayton, Fats Jenkins, and Sonny Boswell. Renaissance Big Five founder/owner Bob Douglas is also enshrined as a contributor.
 On May 9, 2017, the Historic Preservation and Transportation Committee of Community Board 10 unanimously (6-0-0) passed a resolution formally requesting that the New York City Council and the Mayor of New York City enact legislation to support the co-naming at the southeast corner of West 138th Street and Adam Clayton Powell Jr. Boulevard to New York Rens Court.

References

Further reading

External links

Gaines, Jonathan. "Globetrotters weren't first B-ballers from Harlem". Actually they were from Chicago[Cleveland, OH] Call & Post. All-Ohio edition, February 10–16, 2010. Retrieved 2010-06-21.
Hareas, John. "Remembering the Rens". NBA Vintage Stories. No date. Retrieved 2010-06-21.
Kuska, Bob. Hot Potato: How Washington and New York Gave Birth to Black Basketball and Changed America’s Game Forever (University of Virginia Press, 2004)
Smallwood, John. "Renaissance Five". Hoopedia. NBA.com. From the NBA Encyclopedia. Retrieved 2010-06-21.

 

 
Naismith Memorial Basketball Hall of Fame inductees
Basketball teams established in 1923
Sports clubs disestablished in 1949
1923 establishments in New York City
1949 disestablishments in New York (state)